The City of London by-election, 1891 could refer to:

City of London by-election, April 1891
City of London by-election, June 1891